The Kāraṇḍavyūha Sūtra (Tibetan:  ['phags pa] za ma tog bkod pa zhes bya ba theg pa chen po'i mdo; , Vietnamese: Phật Thuyết Đại Thừa Trang Nghiêm Bảo Vương Kinh, Taishō Tripiṭaka 1050) is a Mantrayāna sūtra which extols the virtues and powers of Avalokiteśvara, and is particularly notable for introducing the mantra Om mani padme hum into the sutra tradition.

General features 

The Kāraṇḍavyūha Sūtra is a Mantrayāna sutra that was compiled at the end of the 4th century or beginning of the 5th century CE. According to the Kāraṇḍavyūha Sūtra, the Hindu deities born from Avalokiteśvara bodhisattva's body,

 The Surya (Sun) and Chandra (Moon) are said to be born from Avalokiteśvara's eyes, 
 Maheśvara from his brow,
 Brahma from his shoulders,
 Narayana from his heart, 
 Mahalakshmi from his knee,
 Saraswati from his teeth, 
 Vayu (Wind) from his mouth,
 Varuna (Water) from his stomach,
 Bhudevi (Earth) from his feet. 

The sutra introduces the Buddhist mantra, Om Manipadme Hum, which it states can lead to liberation (moksha) and eventual Buddhahood. A. Studholme sees this famous mantra as being a declarative aspiration, possibly meaning 'I in the jewel-lotus', with the jewel-lotus being a reference to birth in the lotus made of jewels in the Buddhist Eternal Paradise or Pure land 'Sukhavati' of Buddha Amitabha. The mantra is the very heart of Avalokiteśvara (the supreme Buddha of Compassion) and can usher in Awakening. A. Studholme writes:

'Om Manipadme Hum, then, is both the paramahrdaya, or 'innermost heart', of Avalokiteśvara ... It is also ... a mahavidya, a mantra capable of bringing about the 'great knowledge' of enlightenment itself ...' 

Avalokiteśvara himself is linked in the versified version of the sutra to the first Buddha, the Adi-Buddha, who is 'svayambhu' (self-existent, not born from anything or anyone). Studholme comments:

'Avalokitesvara himself, the verse sutra adds, is an emanation of the Adibuddha, or 'primordial Buddha', a term that is explicitly said to be synonymous with Svayambhu and Adinatha, 'primordial lord'.' 

According to a Tibetan legendary tradition, the text of Kāraṇḍavyūhasūtra arrived in a casket from the sky unto the roof of the palace of the 28th king of Tibet, Lha Thothori Nyantsen who died in the fifth century C.E., in southern Tibet. This coincides with one version of dating of the Kāraṇḍavyūhasūtra, somewhere in the 4th or perhaps early 5th century, however it seems more likely that the sutra has originated in Kashmir, due to closeness to characteristics to Kasmiri tantric traditions of the time and to Avataṁsakasūtra earlier associated with the Central Asian regions.

Translations
Tibetan. The Kāraṇḍavyūha Sūtra was first translated into Tibetan as the Za ma tog bkod pa in the 8th century CE by Jinamitra, Yeshe De (or Jnanasutra) and others.
Chinese. The text was translated by T'ien-hsi-tsai  into  Chinese in 983 CE.
French. The Sutra has been translated from the Sanskrit into French by Eugène Burnouf (1801-1852) : Eugène Burnouf (1801-1852) et les études indo-iranologiques, actes de la Journée d'étude d'Urville (28 mai 2022) suivis des Lalitavistara (chap. 1-2) et Kāraṇḍavyūha traduits par E. Burnouf, édités par Guillaume Ducoeur, Université de Strasbourg, 2022.
English. The Sutra has been translated from the Tibetan into English by Peter Alan Roberts with the help of Tulku Yeshi , in 2013.

See also 

 Lotus Sutra (Chapter 25: The Universal Gateway of Avalokiteśvara Bodhisattva)
 God in Buddhism
 Om mani padme hum

References

Bibliography
 
 Roberts, Peter Alan (2012). Translating Translation: An Encounter with the Ninth-Century Tibetan Version of the Kārandavyūha-sūtra, Journal of the Oxford Centre for Buddhist Studies 3, 224-242

External links 

 Mahayana Sublime Treasure King Sutra, English translation of Karandavyuha

 The Noble Mahāyāna Sūtra “The Basket’s Display”, translated from Tibetan by Peter Alan Roberts with Tulku Yeshi (CC-BY-NC-ND)

Mahayana sutras
Avalokiteśvara